Geneviève Morrison (September 24, 1988) is a Canadian wrestler who wrestles in the 48 kg and 51 kg weight class and has earned gold medals in international competition, including the 2015  Pan American Championships.

Career 
Morrison placed first at the Nordhagen Classics in 2012, 2013 and 2015. She earned two gold medals at the FISU World University Championships in 2010 and 2012. She also won a gold medal at the Dave Schultz Memorial in 2012 and bronze medals in 2013 and 2015. In 2015, Morrison  won a gold medal in the 48 kg weight class at the 2015 Pan American Championships.

She trains at the Dinos Wrestling Club in Calgary, Alberta.

References 

Canadian female sport wrestlers
Living people
1988 births
Wrestlers at the 2015 Pan American Games
World Wrestling Championships medalists
Pan American Games gold medalists for Canada
Pan American Games medalists in wrestling
Medalists at the 2015 Pan American Games
20th-century Canadian women
21st-century Canadian women